Burlington is the most populous municipality in the U.S. state of Vermont and the seat of Chittenden County. As of the 2020 U.S. census, the population was 44,743. It is the least populous city in the 50 U.S. states to be the most populous city in its state.

A regional college town, Burlington is home to Champlain College and the University of Vermont (UVM). Vermont's largest hospital, the UVM Medical Center, is within the city limits. The City of Burlington owns Vermont's largest airport, the Burlington International Airport, located in neighboring South Burlington. In 2015, Burlington became the first city in the U.S. to run entirely on renewable energy.

History

Early history to early 20th century 
Two theories have been put forward regarding the origin of Burlington's name. The first is that it was named after Richard Boyle, 3rd Earl of Burlington, and the second is that the name honors the politically prominent and wealthy Burling family of New York. While no Burling family members are listed as grantees of the town, the family held large tracts of land in nearby towns, some of which were granted on the same day as Burlington.

One of the New Hampshire grants, the land that was developed as Burlington was awarded by New Hampshire colonial governor Benning Wentworth on June 7, 1763, to Samuel Willis and 63 others. In the summer of 1775, settlers began clearing the land and built two or three log huts, but the outbreak of the American Revolutionary War delayed permanent settlement until after its conclusion. The town was organized in 1785.

In 1808 the world's first lake-going steamboat was built in Burlington.

The War of 1812 was unpopular in Vermont and the rest of New England, which had numerous trading ties with Canada. Neither Vermont nor other New England states provided militia units or financial support. Vermont voters supported the Federalist Party, which opposed the war.

At one point during the war, the U.S. had 5,000 troops stationed in Burlington, outnumbering residents and putting a strain on resources. About 500 soldiers died of disease, which was always a problem due to poor sanitation in army camps. Some soldiers were quartered in the main building at the University of Vermont, where a memorial plaque commemorates them.

In a skirmish on August 2, 1813, British forces from Canada shelled Burlington. This is described as either a bold stroke by the British with an ineffectual response from the Americans or as a weak sally by the British, which was rightly ignored by the Americans. The cannonade lasted about 10 minutes and caused no casualties. The American troops involved were commanded by Naval Lieutenant Thomas Macdonough, later a hero of the Battle of Lake Champlain.

The town's position on Lake Champlain helped it develop into a port of entry and center for trade, particularly after completion of the Champlain Canal in 1823, the Erie Canal in 1825, and the Chambly Canal in 1843. Wharves allowed steamboats to connect freight and passengers with the Rutland & Burlington Railroad and the Vermont Central Railroad. Burlington became a bustling lumbering and manufacturing center – for some time the third largest lumber market in the world – and was incorporated as a city in 1865. Its Victorian-era prosperity left behind much fine architecture, including buildings by Ammi B. Young, H.H. Richardson, and McKim, Mead & White.

In 1870, the waterfront was extended by construction of the Pine Street Barge Canal. This became polluted over the years and was a focus for cleanup in 2009 under the U.S. Environmental Protection Agency's Superfund program. When elected mayor, Bernie Sanders set in place an extensive waterfront beautification plan which included adding public parks, a nine-mile bike path, and a community boathouse.

On September 5, 1901, U.S. vice president Theodore Roosevelt spoke to a Civil War fraternal group in Burlington. Nine days later, he became U.S. president when President McKinley died.

Late 20th century to present

In 1978, the ice cream enterprise Ben & Jerry's was founded in Burlington in a renovated gas station. It became a national brand, with retail outlets in numerous cities.

In September 2021, during the Jewish High Holy Days, between Rosh Hashanah and Yom Kippur, the city council scheduled an anti-Israel BDS boycott resolution with a vote during the Days of Awe 48 hours before Yom Kippur. This was widely criticized as antisemitic and insensitive by national Jewish organizations, and prompted a counterboycott backlash effort. The resolution, which was denounced by several council members, was withdrawn at the last minute.

Geography
The city of Burlington is situated on the eastern shore of Lake Champlain, north of Shelburne Bay.

A large ravine in what is now downtown was filled in with refuse and raw sewage in the 19th century to make way for further development.

Neighborhoods
Burlington's neighborhoods are generally recognized by residents but have no legal or political authority.
 Downtown: The city's commercial hub is north of Maple Street, west of South Willard Street, and mostly south of Pearl Street (as it includes all property along Pearl Street that is west of South Willard Street).
 Hill Section: Burlington's wealthiest neighborhood is east of South Union Street and Shelburne Street, and south of Main Street, but excludes UVM and University Terrace while including all of Champlain College.  The Hill Section is where the Burlington Country Club is situated.
 The Intervale: The Intervale cannot be considered a neighborhood but is a large area encompassing many locally owned organic farms and nature preserves along the Winooski River. Located to the north of the Old North End and east of the New North End, it is included on this list because its total area is larger than that of most neighborhoods in Burlington.
 New North End: Burlington's most populous neighborhood, a northwest suburban extension of the city, includes all points north of Burlington High School, as well as Leddy Park, Ethan Allen Park, and North Beach, and is west of Vermont Route 127 (the "Burlington Beltline").
 Old North End: Burlington's oldest and most densely populated neighborhood is north of all property along Pearl Street, west of Hyde Street and North Willard Street, and is inclusive of areas north of Downtown and west of the University District but south of the New North End and the Intervale. It is here that Burlington's largely Jewish neighborhood known as Little Jerusalem flourished from the 1880s to the 1930s.
 South End: A once mostly industrial and now mostly artistic district south of Downtown and west of the Hill Section, it includes the waterfront Oakledge Park and is home to the headquarters of many of Burlington's nationally known companies like Burton Snowboards and Dealer.com.
 University District: The University District is north of the Burlington Country Club, south of the Winooski River, east of Willard Street north of Main, and east of a large chunk of the Hill Section. It includes UVM and many former single-family homes converted to student and yuppie apartments (although these are everywhere throughout the city limits and metropolitan area).

Climate

Burlington has a hot-summer humid continental climate (Köppen Dfa), with cold winters and humid summers. Annual snowfall averages , but this figure can fluctuate greatly from one year to another.

There were six such heat waves from 2000–2009.

Demographics

As of the 2020 census estimates, there were 42,899 people living in the city. The racial makeup of the city was 85.7% White, 4.9% Black or African American, 0.4% Native American, 6.0% Asian (1.3% Chinese, 1.1% Bhutanese, 0.9% Nepalese, 0.6% Vietnamese, 0.5% Indian, 0.4% Burmese, 0.3% Indonesian, 0.2% Korean, 0.1% Cambodian, 0.1% Laotian, 0.1% Filipino, 0.1% Japanese, 0.1% Thai), and 2.5% from two or more races. Hispanic or Latino of any race were 2.6% of the population (0.7% Puerto Rican, 0.4% Mexican, 0.3% Dominican, 0.2% Cuban, 0.2% Spanish, 0.2% Colombian, 0.1% Honduran, 0.1% Peruvian, 0.1% Argentine).

There were 16,851 households and the average number of persons per household was 2.13.

Personal income
According to the American Community Surveys for 2015–2019, averaged, the median income for a household in the city was $51,394, and the median income for a family was $87,030. Among workers with full-time, year-round work, males had a median income of $50,552 versus $38,418 for females. The per capita income for the city was $28,480. About 10.6% of families and 26.4% of the population were below the poverty line, including 27.3% of those under age 18 and 13.6% of those age 65 or over.

The median value of owner-occupied housing units was $284,500.

Economy

Burlington's economy centers on education, health services, trade, transportation, and utilities, and some manufacturing. In 2011, the city had an unemployment rate of 4.8%, which was the 6th lowest of all metro areas. Real wages were $39,980 in 2006 constant dollars and remained there to 2010; the state was $33,385; the nation, $36,871.

In 2009, Moody's confirmed the city's bond rating at AA3, "high" quality, the second best rank, but in 2010, the city-owned Burlington Telecom cable provider was unable to pay the city of Burlington $17 million it owed. As a result, Moody's downrated the debt for the city two notches to A2, "upper medium". Moody's also downrated the credit rating for Burlington International Airport.

Business and industry
The largest employers in the city proper are the University of Vermont Medical Center (formerly Fletcher Allen Health Care) and the University of Vermont, employing 6,823 and 3,137 people, respectively. Other companies in Burlington include the G.S. Blodgett Company, one of the oldest and largest commercial oven companies in the country, which manufactures restaurant equipment. Its history dates back to the mid-19th century. General Electric develops software for the healthcare industry in South Burlington at the former headquarters of IDX Systems, which it purchased in 2006. General Dynamics Armament and Technical Products division employ 450 workers locally. A solely owned subsidiary, the division is based here. Dealer.com, a leading automotive internet marketing company, employed about 1000 employees as of 2017.

Ben & Jerry's began in 1978 when Ben Cohen and Jerry Greenfield opened their first ice cream scoop shop in an old gas station in Burlington. Vermont Teddy Bear Company, whose founder started on a cart on a Burlington street, now ships custom teddy bears worldwide.

Corporate headquarters located in Burlington include Burton Snowboards, Bruegger's, Lake Champlain Chocolates, Rhino Foods, and Seventh Generation Inc.

Retailing and tourism

One measure of economic activity is retail sales. Burlington was fifth in the state in 2007 with $242.2 million.

The Church Street Marketplace, a four-block pedestrian mall in the heart of the city, is the site of festivals throughout the year. The American Planning Association named the Marketplace one of America's "Great Public Spaces" for 2008. Events such as the "South End Art Hop" and public galleries such as Pine Street Art Works, provide a forum for the visual arts in the South End.

A "Festival of Fools" had an estimated 25,000 attendees at the Marketplace in 2009. The "Vermont Brewers Festival" had 9,600 attendees in 2009, and the "Giant Pumpkin Regatta and Festival" had 5,000 attendees that same year; Saturday Night Live satirized the event. One of the largest year-round farmers' markets in the state of Vermont is located in the city.

Arts and culture
Dragon boat races to benefit charity have been held in Lake Champlain in August since 2006. In 2009, there were approximately 2,000 participants on 86 teams.

An annual First Night community celebration of the arts on New Year's Eve was founded in 1983 with funding from the National Endowment on the Arts and Vermont Council on the Arts. It ran for 35 years before shutting down in 2018.

Drag troupe, the House of LeMay, hosts the annual "Winter is a Drag Ball" which raises funds for HIV/AIDS-related organizations.

The Emily Post Institute, an etiquette organization, is headquartered here.

Local music

The city has, over the years, supported several local bands as various "scenes" waxed and waned, and has even launched a handful of national acts. The most famous of these is Phish, which originated at UVM in 1983.

Other acts with ties to the city include Matisyahu, Kat Wright, Strangefolk, The Essex Green, RAQ, James Kochalka, The Jazz Mandolin Project, Pork Tornado, Anaïs Mitchell, Greg Davis, Koushik, Grace Potter and the Nocturnals, Dispatch, Prydein, Eugene Hutz of Gogol Bordello, Morgan Page, KT Tunstall, Rubblebucket, The Vacant Lots, Drowningman, 99 Neighbors and Twiddle.

Local art
The "South End Art Hop" is an annual event presented by the South End Arts and Business Association. Artists join businesses, artist studios, and galleries, which in turn open their doors to the public throughout the post-industrial section of Burlington, known as the "South End". The first Art Hop in 1993 had a little more than thirty artists and a dozen sites participating. In 2008, over 600 artists showcased their works in over 100 sites throughout the South End of Burlington. The event takes place on the Friday and Saturday following Labor Day in September.

The city has an art department, Burlington City Arts, which serves many roles including cultural planning, education, showing contemporary art and hosting cultural events at The BCA Center. Burlington City Arts also runs a program in collaboration with UVM Medical Center, Art from the Heart, where patients have access to art supplies and devoted volunteer time.

Public library

The Fletcher Free Library was established in 1873, endowed by Mary Martha Fletcher, the daughter of a local businessman, but outgrew its initial building on Church Street by 1901. A new building was constructed in 1901–04 with funds provided by industrialist and philanthropist Andrew Carnegie, making it the first of the four Carnegie libraries in Vermont. It was designed in the Beaux-Arts style by Walter R. B. Willcox of Burlington, who won a competition to receive the commission.

The building had major settling problems in 1973 where it had been built over a former railroad ravine, which had been improperly filled in, and the library's collection was moved elsewhere. The possible razing of the building was stopped by a citizens' committee, which successfully had it added to the National Register of Historic Places, and a grant allowed the stabilization and repair of the building. A new modern addition was completed in 1981.

The largest public library in Vermont, and listed on the National Register of Historic Places, the Fletcher Free Library had a budget of over $1 million in 2002. It circulated more books, had more visitors, and had more computers, than any other library in Vermont. In addition to its primary services as Burlington's public library, it is also a community center, a cultural resource for newly arrived immigrants to the Burlington area, and the city's only free public access computer center.

Sites of interest

 Ethan Allen Homestead Museum
 Chittenden County Historical Society & Museum
 World's Tallest Filing Cabinet
 ECHO, Leahy Center for Lake Champlain
 Robert Hull Fleming Museum at the University of Vermont
 Flynn Center for the Performing Arts
Burlington Waterfront Park
 The 1885 building of Ohavi Zedek, one of the oldest synagogue buildings still standing in the United States

Landmarks and buildings

Historic buildings

Many of Burlington's historic buildings and sites have been recognized by their inclusion on the National Register of Historic Places (NRHP). In addition to 28 buildings, three shipwrecks and the Burlington Breakwater, the city encompasses 17 historic districts.

Churches and synagogues

Churches in Burlington include the North Avenue Alliance Church, First Baptist Church, First Congregational Church, the Episcopal Cathedral Church of St. Paul, the First United Methodist Church, Christ Church (Presbyterian), the Roman Catholic Cathedral of St. Joseph—the episcopal see for the Diocese of Burlington, the First Unitarian Universalist Society, Dormition of the Mother of God Orthodox Church (Greek Orthodox Archdiocese of America), the College Street Congregational Church (United Church of Christ), The Burlington Church of Christ, and the non-denominational Church at the Well. The Conservative Ohavi Zedek synagogue is also located in the city, and there is an active Meeting of the Religious Society of Friends (Quakers). Synagogues in Burlington include the Chabad of Vermont, Ohavi Zedek, Ahavath Gerim, Ruach HaMaqom, and Ohavi Zedek Chavurah.

The Howard Mortuary Chapel in Lakeview Cemetery was built in 1882 as a gift to the City of Burlington from Hannah Louisa Howard, a local philanthropist. A native of the city, she was the daughter of John Howard, a successful Burlington hotelier. The chapel was designed in the High Victorian Gothic style by Alfred Benjamin Fisher, on cemetery grounds designed by E. C. Ryer in 1871.

The Ira Allen Chapel on the grounds of the University of Vermont campus, was completed in 1926, and was designed in the Georgian Revival style by McKim, Mead & White.  The chapel's flashing beacon provides a nighttime landmark for those approaching Burlington from Lake Champlain. The chapel is part of the University Green Historic District.

Two of the cathedrals in Burlington—the Episcopal Cathedral Church of St. Paul and the former Roman Catholic Cathedral of the Immaculate Conception—are modern structures built after their predecessors were destroyed by arson fires in 1971–1972. The Episcopal Cathedral was completed in 1973 and was designed by Burlington Associates (now TruexCollins) in the Brutalist style, while the Roman Catholic Cathedral was built in 1974–1977 and was designed by Edward Larrabee Barnes, with the park-like grounds designed by landscape architect Dan Kiley. Immaculate Conception was closed in 2018 and replaced by the Cathedral of Saint Joseph (Neoclassical, 1887).

Sports

The Vermont Lake Monsters of the Futures Collegiate Baseball League, a collegiate summer baseball team, were formerly called the Vermont Expos. The team changed its name in 2007 after its parent Major League Baseball club, the Montreal Expos of the National League, moved from Montreal to Washington, D.C., and became the Washington Nationals. In 2010, the Lake Monsters ended its 17-year association with the Expos/Nationals and became the Class A affiliate of the Oakland Athletics of the American League. The Lake Monsters play on the campus of the University of Vermont at Centennial Field.

Burlington has a rich hockey history, and was the location of the first known international ice hockey match, held between the Montreal Crystals and employees of the Van Ness House, a local hotel, during the 1886 Burlington Winter Carnival. The University of Vermont's men's hockey team, the Catamounts, play their home games at the 4,007-seat Gutterson Field House on the UVM campus.

A professional basketball franchise, the Vermont Frost Heaves, played half of their season in the city until the team folded in 2011. The team, which originally was part of the American Basketball Association—not to be confused with the 1970s-era major basketball league of the same name that merged with the National Basketball Association—moved to the Premier Basketball League in 2008 and split their regular-season home games between Burlington and Barre. The Frost Heaves, owned by Sports Illustrated writer Alexander Wolff, played their Burlington games at the Memorial Auditorium, on South Union Street, at the corner of Main. However, the franchise folded in early 2011.

The Vermont City Marathon has drawn thousands of competitors annually. A local Golden Gloves boxing tournament has been held annually since 1946.

Burlington was a venue site for the 2012 International Ice Hockey Federation Women's World Championship.

Government

Burlington has had a mayor–council form of government since 1865 with its first mayor being Albert L. Catlin. Democrats and Progressives make up the majority of the council. Miro Weinberger, the current mayor, is a Democrat who was first elected in 2012. The City Council has twelve seats. Prior to 2020, they were occupied by five Progressives, four Democrats, two Independents, and one Republican. After the 2020 city elections, the Republican seat flipped to Democratic, and one Independent seat flipped to Progressive.

U.S. senator and presidential candidate Bernie Sanders served as the mayor of Burlington from 1981 to 1989. His election in 1981 unseated longstanding mayor Gordon Paquette and drastically altered the political landscape of the city. Mayor Sanders created a government that was run by young Progressives, including Peter Clavelle, who was elected mayor of the city when Sanders stepped down to run for higher office. Peter Clavelle, Burlington's longest-serving mayor, held the office from 1989 to 1993, and again from 1995 to 2006.

In the 1980s, the successive reelections of a self-proclaimed "socialist" drew attention from the national media. Sanders has dispelled the notion that his first victory, secured by a narrow margin, was "just a fluke".

The large transient student population votes in local, state, and national elections, resulting in a considerable impact on local elections. The city signed up 2,527 new voters in the six weeks from September 1, 2008, the highest number for that time frame in over nine years.

As a non-profit institution, the University of Vermont pays no real estate taxes, though, like many other schools, it does make an annual payment in place of taxes. In 2007, the college agreed to raise this from $456,006 to $912,011 in 2010 plus a "public works" supplement rising from $180,040 to $191,004 over the same time frame.

The city maintains three parks on Lake Champlain. All three are free for public access, with two having parking fees.

City council members
In 2021, voters adopted a charter amendment to elect the council by ranked-choice voting. Before the amendment can go into effect, however, it must be passed by the state legislature and approved by the governor. The state house approved the amendment on February 23, 2022, sending it to the state senate.

Education

Public schools
Burlington School District operates the city's public schools.

Schools:
 Burlington High School
 The Sustainability Academy (at Lawrence Barnes Elementary)
 Edmunds Elementary School, named after George F. Edmunds, a U.S. senator for 25 years, from 1866 to 1891
 Edmunds Middle School, (formerly Burlington High School)
 Lyman C. Hunt Middle School
 Flynn Elementary School
 Champlain Elementary School
 C. P. Smith Elementary
 The Integrated Arts Academy (at H.O. Wheeler Elementary)

Magnet schools
In Burlington, students have two choices of magnet schools: the Integrated Arts Academy at H.O. Wheeler (IAA) and the Sustainability Academy at Lawrence Barnes (SA).

Private schools
Christ the King School
Mater Christi School
Rock Point School

Colleges and universities

The University of Vermont (UVM) and Champlain College are located in this college town. The UVM Medical Center is home to one of the ten most selective medical schools in the U.S., the Robert Larner College of Medicine. The Community College of Vermont had a site located in Burlington until 2010 when a new building in the adjacent city of Winooski was constructed for the college. Saint Michael's College and a satellite campus of Southern New Hampshire University are in the neighboring town of Colchester. Vermont Technical College also has a satellite campus in nearby Williston.

Media

Newspapers and other publications
Burlington is the media center of northern and central Vermont. It is served by:
 The Burlington Free Press, a daily newspaper delivered throughout Vermont
 Seven Days, a free weekly newspaper delivered in bulk to pickup points throughout the Burlington metropolitan area and central Vermont, emphasizing arts and culture
 Vermont Business Magazine
 Vermont Digger
 The Natural Philosopher, a monthly science news journal articulating primary literature in neuroscience, biochemistry, and genetics. The Natural Philosopher is a student-run publication based at the University of Vermont.

Radio
Major radio stations that are based in Burlington and serve the region:
 WBTZ (The Buzz) – 99.9 FM (modern rock)
 WCPV (101.3 ESPN) – 101.3 FM (sports)
 WCVT (101 The One) – 101.7 FM (classic album tracks)
 WEZF (Star 92.9) – 92.9 FM (hot adult contemporary)
 WIZN (The Wizard) – 106.7 FM (classic rock)
 WJOY – 1230 AM (adult standards)
 WKOL (KOOL 105) – 105.1 FM (classic hits)
 WNCS and W227AQ (The Point) – 104.7 and 93.3 FM, respectively (Triple-A)
 WOKO  – 98.9 FM (country)
 WOXR (Vermont Public Radio) – 90.9 FM (classical)
 WRUV (University of Vermont) – 90.1 FM (variety)
 WTNN (Eagle Country) – 97.5 FM
 WVMT – 620 AM (news/talk)
 WVPS (Vermont Public Radio) – 107.9 FM (news & information), National Public Radio
 WWPV (Saint Michael's College) – 92.5 FM (variety)
 WXXX – 95.5 FM (Hit Music Station)

Television

Five network-affiliated television stations serve the greater Burlington area. They include WFFF-TV channel 44 (Fox), its sister station WVNY channel 22 (ABC), WPTZ channel 5 (NBC, with Me-TV on DT3), its sister station WNNE channel 31 (CW), and WCAX-TV channel 3 (CBS). All of the stations (including WVNY and WNNE which share news departments with WFFF-TV and WPTZ, respectively) operate news departments. Although licensed to Burlington, WCAX is based in neighboring South Burlington, while WPTZ is based in Plattsburgh, New York, with a news bureau in nearby Colchester. WFFF and WVNY are also based in Colchester, while WNNE is licensed to Montpelier.
Comcast is the metro area's major cable television service provider, although residents within the Burlington city limits are also served by municipally-owned Burlington Telecom.

Infrastructure

Transportation

Bus
Burlington is the central focus of Green Mountain Transit (GMT), which provides bus service to and from surrounding municipalities.

On June 15, 2011, the Chittenden County Transportation Authority announced that it had changed its charter, effective July 1, 2011, to allow municipalities outside Chittenden County to join CCTA as member communities, thereby allowing CCTA to become Vermont's first regional transit authority. As part of its expansion, the CCTA merged with the Green Mountain Transit Authority (GMTA), which provided bus service in the Barre-Montpelier area and surrounding communities in central Vermont.

Greyhound provides intercity bus service from the Burlington International Airport and Downtown Transit Center bus station to other communities in Vermont, and to Montreal's Gare d'autocars de Montreal and Boston's South Station and Logan International Airport. Premier Coach's Vermont Translines also provides intercity bus service between Burlington and Albany, New York, along the U.S. Route 7 corridor in a partnership with Greyhound, also from the Burlington International Airport. Megabus provides service between Burlington and Boston with a stop in Montpelier, Vermont.

Rail
Burlington is connected to New York City via Amtrak's Ethan Allen Express, which began serving the city in July 2022. Service is to Union Station, built on the city's waterfront in 1916. The extension to Burlington was first proposed in 2013 by Vermont governor Peter Shumlin.

Rail service began in Burlington in 1849. From the late nineteenth century to 1953, the Rutland Railroad provided passenger service on the Green Mountain Flyer and the Mount Royal from Burlington to Troy, New York, with connecting service to New York City via the New York Central Railroad. The last passenger train to run north via the Burlington Tunnel to Alburgh, a town in the northwest extremity of Vermont, was in June 1938. From 2000 to 2003, the Champlain Flyer was a commuter service from Burlington south to the town of Charlotte, Vermont.

Air
Air carriers at Burlington International Airport (BTV) provide the area with commercial service to major regional hubs and international airports. While scheduled carriers have not traditionally offered scheduled commercial flights to destinations outside the United States, there is a Customs Port of Entry for unscheduled flights. From 2011 to 2018, the only available international commercial flights for BTV were via Porter Airlines' winter seasonal service to and from Billy Bishop Airport in Toronto.

Major roads
Burlington is served by one major Interstate highway, along with its spur route into the southern part of the city, and is at the junction of two U.S. highways. Several Vermont state highways also provide routes into and through the Burlington area.

  Interstate 89 – Though it does not directly enter the Burlington city limits, I-89 has interchanges in neighboring South Burlington, Winooski, and Colchester that provide access to downtown.
  Interstate 189 – I-189 connects I-89 in South Burlington to U.S. 7 at the southern end of Burlington.
  U.S. Route 2 is the main east–west route entering Burlington. After entering the city from the east, westbound U.S. 2 turns north to run concurrently with U.S. 7 towards Winooski and Colchester. The intersection with Interstate 89 is used by 42,000 cars daily.
  U.S. Route 7 is the main north–south route through Burlington. Northbound U.S. 7 joins westbound U.S. 2 in downtown Burlington, and the two routes run concurrently north to Colchester before diverging.
  Vermont Route 127 connects downtown and the Old North End with the New North End and the town of Colchester. Throughout the New North End, VT-127 is a limited-access highway officially named the Winooski Valley Parkway, though commonly known as the "Burlington Beltline".

Ferry service
Burlington is the headquarters of the Lake Champlain Transportation Company, a privately held company that offers ferry service for the North Country of New York state and the Champlain Valley region of Vermont. Summer seasonal service is available from Burlington's King Street Dock to Port Kent, New York. One line of year-round 24-hour service is provided from the nearby town of Grand Isle, Vermont, to Plattsburgh, New York, with another line of daily service from Charlotte, Vermont, to Essex, New York.

Internet
The city has municipal fiber broadband, which provides telephone, broadband internet, and television. In 2008, cable management tried to drop Al-Jazeera English from the lineup. This was successfully thwarted by protesters and the station was, in 2009, one of three "small cable operators" in the nation to carry this channel.

Electricity
Like many Vermont municipalities, Burlington owns its own power company, Burlington Electric Department. In 2009, the department announced that it would purchase 40% of the output of the 40 MW Sheffield, Vermont, wind-generated electricity when it became available.

Renewable energy 
Burlington began operating on 100% renewable energy in 2014 after being a pioneer in the renewable energy sector for decades. The Burlington Electric Department, which began operating in 1903, originally used coal as a primary source of energy. However, after experiencing the effects of fluctuating coal prices throughout the second World War, the department slowly began using wood as an energy source because of the price and overall energy efficiency of wood. Since then, the city has experienced a sustainability boom, and today runs on 100% renewable energy. A succession of mayors in the city, along with corresponding public interest, are credited with this change. Gordon Paquette made the decision to completely transition from coal to wood at the McNeil Generating Station in 1977, and Bernie Sanders picked up this momentum of the environmental movement in the small city. This continued with Peter Clavelle, who mandated recycling in the city, and passed a number of bonds which funded energy improvements in infrastructure. In 1995, the city issued the Legacy Plan, which aimed to "go beyond the branding and rhetoric and create actual examples that will resonate and make a difference in people's lives."

Today, that plan has come to fruition in many ways. The city operates entirely on energy from the Winooski One Hydro Plant, a series of wind turbines and solar panels, as well as the sustainably-sourced wood burning plant at McNeil Generating Station. This made Burlington the first city to run completely on sustainable energy sources: a landmark for green infrastructure. Along with keeping energy rates low for customers, sustainability in the city extends beyond energy infrastructure. A non-profit organization in the city started an incubator farm that produces 30,000 pounds of fresh, local food for those facing food insecurity. The city has also worked on drastic building restoration projects, installed bikeways for more efficient transportation, and prioritized energy saving in the downtown.

In September 2019, the current mayor Miro Weinberger announced plans to get the city to net zero status by 2030. This would mean that the city would produce and consume equal amounts of energy. In October 2020, Burlington Electric proposed an ordinance that would require all buildings in the city to switch to electric energy sources. This would put the city closer to that net-zero goal, and continues its legacy as a trailblazer for sustainable infrastructure.

Health and social services
Burlington is home to University of Vermont Medical Center, a tertiary referral hospital for Vermont and the North Country of New York, Level I Trauma Center, and teaching hospital.

In 2008, the U.S. Centers for Disease Control and Prevention reported that Burlington ranks high among U.S. metropolitan areas by having the largest proportion of people – 92 percent – who say they are in good or great health.  The report went on to rate it best in exercise and lowest in obesity, diabetes, and other measures of ill health. In 2009, Children's Health Magazine rated Burlington the best city in the country to raise a family.

In 2010, the government banned smoking within  of the city's parks and recreational areas.

Howard Center, headquartered in Burlington, provides social services to state residents, and runs Vermont's first and the area's only methadone maintenance program, the Chittenden Clinic.

Notable people

Sister and friendship cities

Burlington's sister cities are:
 Arad, Israel
 Bethlehem, Palestine
 Honfleur, France
 Moss Point, Mississippi, United States
 Puerto Cabezas, Nicaragua
 Yaroslavl, Russia

Burlington's friendship cities:
 Burlington, Canada
 Nishinomiya, Japan

Sister lakes
Burlington and other communities surrounding Lake Champlain has sister lake relationships with communities around these lakes:
 Lake Ohrid, straddling the border of Albania and North Macedonia
 Lake Toba, Indonesia

See also 
Five Sisters (Burlington, Vermont)

Notes

References

Bibliography

External links

 City of Burlington official website

 
Burlington, Vermont metropolitan area
Cities in Chittenden County, Vermont
Cities in Vermont
County seats in Vermont
Populated places established in 1783
1783 establishments in Vermont